Gohar Armenyan (born 16 February 1995) is an Armenian footballer who plays as a forward. She has been a member of the Armenia women's national team.

See also
List of Armenia women's international footballers

References

1995 births
Living people
Women's association football forwards
Armenian women's footballers
Armenia women's international footballers